Burnage Rugby Football Club is an English rugby union team based in Stockport, Greater Manchester. The club runs four senior sides, a colts team and an under-15s side. The first XV plays in North 1 West, a level six league in the English rugby union system. More recently, the club has established a thriving academy, for both boys and girls from age under-5 through to under-13

History
Burnage Rugby Club was founded as an old boys' club for ex-pupils of Burnage High School in 1936. The club moved from Burnage in South Manchester to a new site at Heaton Mersey in Stockport in the 1970s.

Ground and facilities
As well as three rugby pitches (4G plus two traditional grass pitches), the club site includes a par 3, 9-hole golf and foot-golf course (Heaton Mersey Valley Golf Course) and 3G artificial rugby and football pitches.

Honours
North Lancs 2 champions: 1998–99
Cumbria v North Lancashire 1 promotion play-off winners: 2004–05
South Lancs/Cheshire 1 champions: 2008–09
North 1 (east v west) promotion play-off winners: 2010–11
North 1 West champions: 2019–20

References

External links
Official club website
Burnage Rugby Academy
Burnage Car Boot

English rugby union teams
Rugby clubs established in 1936
Sport in Stockport